The state anthem of the Republic of Kazakhstan, simply referred to in Kazakh as "Menıñ Qazaqstanym", became the national anthem of Kazakhstan on 7 January 2006, replacing the previous one since independence in 1991, which used the same melody as the anthem of the Kazakh Soviet Socialist Republic.

It is based on a homonymous patriotic song created by Kazakh composer Shamshi Kaldayakov and poet Jumeken Najimedenov in 1956. The original lyrics were modified in 2005 by the first president of Kazakhstan, Nursultan Nazarbayev, before the decree was issued.

Origins
This song is based on a 1956 patriotic song titled "Menıñ Qazaqstanym" created in response to the Soviet Virgin Lands Campaign program. There is debate over whether it was to celebrate the program or to insist Soviet authorities should not turn Kazakhstan into Russia's corn belt.

Lyrics

Current official

1956 lyrics
Below are the 1956 original lyrics by Jumeken Näjımedenov, that were later edited.

Protocol
"Menıñ Qazaqstanym" is played during official state ceremonies and social functions, such as sporting events involving national sports teams of Kazakhstan. All radio stations and television networks across the country play the national anthem twice, once during "Sign-On" and "Sign-Off" every day, the performance of the anthem is not regulated by any government law; however, there is traditional protocol that is employed during a performance of the song. Most citizens put their hands over their heart while singing the anthem following United States practice. Traditionally universal etiquette is to stand during the performance. Officers and personnel of the Kazakh Armed Forces offer a Russian-style military salute when in uniform during the performance of the anthem when not in formation.

2012 sporting event incidents
In March 2012, a parody national anthem, O Kazakhstan, featured in the soundtrack of the movie Borat, was mistakenly played at the International Shooting Grand Prix in Kuwait. The Gold-winning medalist, Mariya Dmitriyenko, stood on the dais while the entire parody was played. The team complained, and the award ceremony was re-staged. The incident apparently resulted from the wrong song being downloaded from YouTube at the last minute. Senior officials in Kazakhstan were furious with the error and vowed to make a complaint to their Kuwaiti counterparts.

A similar incident had taken place earlier that month at the opening ceremony of a skiing festival in Kostanay, in which the first bar of Ricky Martin's single "Livin' La Vida Loca" was played instead of "Meniñ Qazaqstanım". However, "Meniñ Qazaqstanım" was played properly following the mistake.

See also

Anthem of the Republic of Kazakhstan
List of national anthems

Notes

References

External links

Kazakh.ru — This Russian language website with news about Kazakhstan has an article about the new state anthem, with an MP3 vocal file
"National Anthem of Kazakhstan - 'Менің Қазақстаным' (Cool Instrumental Version)" — Instrumental version in E Minor 
"Meniñ Qazaqstanım (1956) [Original Kazakh National Anthem-Song]" — Original 1956 song

National anthems
My Kazakhstan
Kazakhstani culture
National symbols of Kazakhstan
Asian anthems
Kazakh anthems
National anthem compositions in D minor
National anthem compositions in E minor